The Gnome-Mobile is a 1967 American fantasy comedy film directed by Robert Stevenson and produced by Walt Disney Productions. Based on the 1936 book The Gnomobile by Upton Sinclair, it was one of the last films personally supervised by Walt Disney. Walter Brennan plays a dual role as D.J. Mulrooney, the kind-hearted lumber tycoon of Irish descent; and as the irascible 943-year-old gnome Knobby in the film, which has been described as "wavering between a comedy, a romance, a drama, and an environmental critique". The children, Elizabeth and Rodney, were played by Karen Dotrice and Matthew Garber, previously the Banks children in Mary Poppins (1964). Tom Lowell (who previously appeared in the 1965 Disney film That Darn Cat!), Richard Deacon, and Sean McClory round out the rest of the film's cast.

The Gnome-Mobile was the final film for both Matthew Garber and Ed Wynn. Wynn died of throat cancer before the movie was released and Garber died ten years later, having contracted hepatitis while visiting India. Richard and Robert Sherman contributed the song "Gnome Mobile".

The Gnome-Mobile was re-released theatrically on November 5, 1976.

Plot 
The story opens with the children's grandfather, D.J. Mulrooney, a well-known executive officer of a timber-trading company. D.J. is going to Seattle to sell 50,000 acres of timberland and takes his customized 1930 Rolls-Royce Phantom II on the trip. In a brief conversation with his company's head of security, Ralph Yarby, we learn that the car was purchased after D.J. earned his first million dollars. His first stop is the airport, where he picks up his grandchildren, 10-year-old Elizabeth and 8-year-old Rodney, who are to accompany D.J. on his trip to Seattle.

Traveling north from San Francisco, the trio detour through what later became Redwood National Park where D.J. has endowed a grove of Redwood trees, entitled "Mulrooney Grove". There they encounter a gnome called Jasper, who has "a terrible problem". They also are introduced to Jasper's 943-year-old grandfather Knobby who, like D.J., is passionate and short-tempered. Jasper's "terrible problem" is that Knobby is suffering from a sickness called "fading", or becoming semi-transparent. D.J. diagnoses this as Knobby losing the will to live. The reason for this "fading" is that Knobby fears that he and Jasper are the last two of their Gnome kind, and Knobby wants Jasper to find a bride before Knobby dies. Knobby harbors immense hatred for humans because of the human's logging damage to the forests and the livelihood of gnomes. D.J. Mulrooney is startled when Knobby exclaims that the worst loggers were "Mulrooney's Marauders", but the gnomes agree to go along with the trio and seek other gnomes. As they leave together, the children rename the Rolls-Royce "the Gnome-Mobile".

Jasper and his grandfather are kidnapped by Horatio Quaxton, a freak show owner, while D.J. is committed to an asylum by Yarby, who has heard about the gnomes and deems his boss insane. Rodney and Elizabeth rescue D.J. from the asylum, rescue Jasper from Quaxton, and then set out to find Knobby, who had managed to escape earlier.

They arrive in the woods to find Knobby delighted with the presence of a thriving community of gnomes. Jasper is recognized by Rufus the Gnome King as "the eligible gnome" to a large number of young females of his race, who compete in a contest to determine which one will marry him. He is smitten with one timid, lovely girl gnome named Shy Violet, who is very clumsy and very innocent, even though she is hated by all of the other girl gnomes. Jasper tries to get Violet to catch him, but she keeps getting pushed to the side and run over by the other very aggressive girl gnomes. However, after a very wild chase, Violet manages to win the race and she and Jasper get married.

D.J. gives as a wedding present the rights to the 50,000 acres of forest that were to be sold for logging, which become a haven for the gnomes.

Cast and characters

 Walter Brennan – D.J. Mulrooney/Knobby
 Matthew Garber – Rodney Winthrop
 Karen Dotrice – Elizabeth Winthrop
 Richard Deacon – Ralph Yarby
 Tom Lowell – Jasper
 Sean McClory – Horatio Quaxton
 Ed Wynn – Rufus the Gnome King
 Jerome Cowan – Dr. Ramsey
 Charles Lane – Dr. Scoggins
 Norman Grabowski – Male Nurse
 Gil Lamb – Gas Attendant
 Maudie Prickett – Katie Barrett
 Cami Sebring – Violet

Reception
Roger Ebert of the Chicago Sun-Times gave the film three stars out of four, calling the special effects "fascinating" and reporting that the kids in the audience "got their money's worth". Howard Thompson of The New York Times described it as "a good-natured but heavy-handed little comedy," finding that "the action and light-hearted spirit sag under a crisscross jumble of slapstick and broadly handled locomotion that flattens the fun". Arthur D. Murphy of Variety described the film as "amusing, if somewhat uneven". Charles Champlin of the Los Angeles Times wrote: "The moppet audience for which 'The Gnome-Mobile' is intended will obviously find it a delight, funny and ingenious. The full-sized among us will find a few laughs, too, but cannot rank the film with Disney's best by a long shot, or a gnome shot." The Monthly Film Bulletin called it: "A whimsical fantasy in the Disney tradition of clean, honest fun, with a merrily tuneful title song, moderately ingenious trick work, and some unsophisticated comedy of which the highlight is a car chase in which the aristocratic old Rolls is pursued by a modern vehicle which bit by bit falls to pieces."

Film critic Leonard Maltin rates this as one of Disney's best comedy-fantasy films, and states that it is a "mystery" why the film is not better known. He says it deserves to be rediscovered and enjoyed by a new generation, especially younger children.

References

External links
  

 
1930 Rolls-Royce Sedanca Deville & Movie Set on display

1967 films
Walt Disney Pictures films
Fictional cars
Films directed by Robert Stevenson
Films produced by James Algar
Films set in California
1960s fantasy films
Sherman Brothers
Films about automobiles
Films scored by Buddy Baker (composer)
Films based on works by Upton Sinclair
Films set in forests
1960s English-language films